Neuropsychobiology is a peer-reviewed scientific journal that focuses on neuroscience, psychopharmacology, and biological psychiatry. It was established in 1975 and is published by Karger Publishers.

Karger academic journals
English-language journals
Neuroscience journals
Publications established in 1975
8 times per year journals